The Arnold and Marie Schwartz College of Pharmacy, formerly known as the Brooklyn College of Pharmacy, is a graduate school of Long Island University (LIU)'s Brooklyn Campus. Founded in 1886, it is one of the oldest pharmacy schools in the United States today. It became affiliated with LIU in 1929, and was fully merged into LIU in 1976.

History
A fundraising campaign was begun so the school could be recognized as a degree granting institution.  They began their first formal course of instruction on October 1, 1891. At first, it was a one-year certificate program but with recognition, it became a two-year Pharmacy Graduate degree.

Students attended lectures in a two-room apartment at 399 Classon Avenue. The kitchen was a laboratory and the parlor was the lecture hall. Among the members of the first class was William D. Anderson, Ph.G. who became the third dean of the college.

In 1929, they moved to 600 Lafayette Avenue, which included a gymnasium where the school's intercollegiate basketball team played.

Deans
Current Dean: John M. Pezzuto 
 Dean Stephen M. Gross, Ed.D.
 William D. Anderson

Historical locations
 1892: 399 Classon Avenue, Brooklyn, NY
 1903: 265-271 Nostrand Avenue, Brooklyn, NY
 1929: 600 Lafayette Avenue, n, NY 
 1976: LIU, University Plaza, (Dekalb Avenue and Flatbush Avenue), Brooklyn, NY

Programs and degrees
 Pharm.D 
 Doctor of Philosophy in Pharmaceutics
 M.S. in Pharmaceutics - Cosmetic Science
 M.S. in Pharmaceutics - Industrial Pharmacy
 M.S. in Drug Regulatory Affairs
 M.S. in Pharmacology & Toxicology

Student ratios
M/F 40/60 male to female 
Total Students = 300

Notable alumni 
Christian (Gunnvald Kristian) Faaland, Norwegian-American WWI 106th Infantry Regiment Soldier and Prisoner of War

References

Long Island University
Pharmacy schools in New York (state)